Cécille Calmette (born 2 July 1968) is a French former professional tennis player.

Calmette is most noted for her performance as a wildcard at the 1985 French Open, making the third round with wins over Mercedes Paz and Anne Minter, before her run was ended by 10th-seed Bonnie Gadusek.

References

External links
 
 

1968 births
Living people
French female tennis players